El Ermitaño is a peak in Chile with an elevation of  metres located at Puna de Atacama. It is on the border of the Chilean provinces of Chañaral and Copiapó (Communes of Diego de Almagro and Copiapó) Along with Cerro Peña Blanca, lies on the southern rim of the Wheelwright Caldera.

First Ascent
El Ermitaño was first climbed by Sergio Kunsmann, Pedro Rosende and Etienne Vian (Chile) Heinz Koch (Germany) in 11/21/1967.

Elevation 
It has an official height of 6146 meters. Other data from available digital elevation models: SRTM yields 6134 metres, ASTER 6113 metres and TanDEM-X 6175 metres. The height of the nearest key col is 4802 meters, leading to a topographic prominence of 1344 meters. El Ermitaño is considered a Mountain Subrange according to the Dominance System  and its dominance is 21.87%. Its parent peak is Cerro El Condor and the Topographic isolation is 29.2 kilometers.

External links 

 Elevation information about El Ermitaño
 Weather Forecast at El Ermitaño

See also
List of mountains in the Andes
San Francisco Pass

References

Mountains of Chile
Six-thousanders of the Andes